Rafael Bautista Arenas (born October 7, 1965) is a Mexican football manager and former player. He played for Monarcas Morelia and Atlético Celaya.

After he retired from playing football, Bautista became a coach. He managed A.D. Municipal Pérez Zeledón and Puntarenas F.C. in Costa Rica.

References

1966 births
Living people
Association football defenders
Atlético Morelia players
Atlético Celaya footballers
Liga MX players
Footballers from Mexico City
Mexican footballers